François Caron (1600–1673), French Huguenot refugee to the Netherlands who served the Dutch East India Company and explored Japan
 François Caron (politician) (1766–1848), representative of Saint-Maurice in the Legislative Assembly of Lower Canada 
 François Caron (economist) (1931–2014), French historian and economist
 François Caron (hockey player) (born 1984), Canadian hockey player
 François Caron (actor), French cinema and television actor
 François Caron (French Navy officer) (born 1937), French Navy officer and historian